Lafayette "Reb" Russell (born Lafayette H. Russell; May 31, 1905 – March 16, 1978) was an American football running back and later an actor. He played college football at the University of Nebraska and Northwestern University, and professionally in the National Football League for the New York Giants and the Philadelphia Eagles, appearing in 10 games in 1933. As a small-time actor following his playing days, he appeared in a series of low-budget Westerns.

Filmography

External links

 
 
 Lafayette Russell at the Old Corral

1905 births
1978 deaths
20th-century American male actors
American football running backs
Male actors from Kansas
Male Western (genre) film actors
Nebraska Cornhuskers football players
New York Giants players
Northwestern Wildcats football players
People educated at Missouri Military Academy
People from Osawatomie, Kansas
Philadelphia Eagles players